Pressure sensitive may refer to:

 Pressure-sensitive adhesive
 Pressure-sensitive paper
 Pressure-sensitive tape
 Piezoelectric sensor
 Pressure sensor
 Pressure sensitive microphone see also proximity effect
 the force with which a key is held after initial impact (see keyboard expression)
 Pressure Sensitive, a 1975 album by Ronnie Laws